82 Aquarii is a star in the equatorial constellation of Aquarius. 82 Aquarii is its Flamsteed designation. It has an apparent visual magnitude of 6.15, which, according to the Bortle Dark-Sky Scale, means it is a faint star that requires dark rural skies to view. Because this star is positioned near the ecliptic, it is subject to lunar eclipses.

This object is an aging red giant star currently on the asymptotic giant branch with a stellar classification of M2 III, having exhausted both the hydrogen and helium at its core and expanded to 56 times the Sun's radius. It is a suspected variable star of unknown type that ranges in magnitude between 6.24 and 6.29. The star is radiating 693 times the luminosity of the Sun from its swollen photosphere at an effective temperature of 3,946 K.

References

External links
 Image 82 Aquarii

M-type giants
Suspected variables
Aquarius (constellation)
Durchmusterung objects
Aquarii, 082
217701
113781
8763